Elections to Cumbria County Council were held on 1 May 1997. This was on the same day as other UK county council elections. The Labour Party gained control of the council, which had been under no overall control.

Results

References

Cumbria
1997
1990s in Cumbria